NA-248 Karachi Central-II is a constituency for the National Assembly of Pakistan.

Area
The constituency includes the areas of Bandhani Colony, Godhra Camp, Al Azam Square, Gabol Colony, Sharifabad, Timber Market, Hussainabad, Sohrab Goth, Azizabad, Al Noor Society, Aga Khan University Hospital, Samanabad, Gulberg, Ancholi, Water Pump, Gulshan-e-Ameen, and Yousuf Plaza.

Members of Parliament

2002-2018: NA-246 Karachi-VIII

2018-2023: NA-254 Karachi Central-II

Election 2002 

General elections were held on 10 October 2002. Haji Aziz Ullah of Muttahida Qaumi Movement won by 53,134 votes.

Election 2008 

General elections were held on 18 February 2008. Sufiyan Yousuf of the Muttahida Qaumi Movement won by 186,993 votes.

Election 2013 

General elections were held on 11 May 2013. Nabeel Gabol of Muttahida Qaumi Movement won by 137,874 votes and became the member of National Assembly.

By-election 2015 
A by-election was held on 23 April 2015 due to the resignation of Nabeel Gabol, the previous MNA from this seat. Kanwar Naveed Jamil of Muttahida Qaumi Movement won by 95,644 votes while Imran Ismail of the Pakistan Tehreek-e-Insaf was in second place with 35,546 votes.

Election 2018 

General elections were held on 25 July 2018.

By-election 2023 
A by-election will be held on 16 March 2023 due to the resignation of Muhammad Aslam Khan, the previous MNA from this seat.

See also
NA-247 Karachi Central-I
NA-249 Karachi Central-III

References

External links 
Election result's official website

NA-246
Karachi